KazInvestBank (KIB), previously KazInterBank, is a Kazakhstan commercial bank. On 27 December 2016, the Kazakhstan authorities revoked the licence of Kazinvestbank citing its repeated failures to process payments.

History

1993-2003: Investment bank 
In 1993, the Kazakhstan International Bank (KazInterBank or KIB) is founded with 50% interest of the Government of the Republic of Kazakhstan and 50% interest of Chase Manhattan Bank, NY. In 1995, shares of the Chase Manhattan Bank are acquired by the Government of Kazakhstan due to changes in banking regulations. The Bank becomes private following privatization process.

From 1995 to 2003, the bank provided primarily investment banking services, attracting investments to Kazakhstan, and assisting in privatization of state shareholdings in Kazakh companies. In 1998, the KIB acted as advisor to help complete a merger of two major geophysical companies, International Energy Services Inc. (USA) and Azimuth (Kazakhstan) with a combined asset value of US$40 million.

2004: Commercial bank 
In 2003, the KIB was acquired by new shareholders. A new strategy was set to develop a universal commercial bank rendering a full range of services to corporate clients throughout Kazakhstan.

In March 2004, the bank joined the Kazakhstan Individual Deposit Guarantee (insurance) System. Then in April 2004, KazInvestBank obtained a banking license for main banking services and opened its first operating office in Almaty. In June 2004, the KIB jointly with Credit Suisse First Boston International arranged US$105 million pre-export facilities for JSC Food Contract Corporation.

In December 2004, Adnan Ally Agha was appointed chief executive officer. In July 2005, Oleg Kononenko joined KazInvestBank as a member of the board of directors.

In September 2005, KazInvestBank obtained a license for complete range of banking services, including issuance of cards and issuance/confirmation of letters of credit.

In June 2006, the KIB completes the consolidation operational system in branches which allowed the bank to present same services to customers in all branches and subsidiaries. In February 2006, the KIB acted as an arranger and a subscription agent for the first issue of international securities on the local market.

In February 2006, the European Bank for Reconstruction and Development (EBRD) approved a US$10 million line under trade facilitation program, to contribute to the development of trade finance products and strengthen the position of the KIB in the international market. Then in June 2007, the EBRD and City Venture Capital International (CVCI) jointly acquired 40% equity in KazInvestBank Bank. The following month, the ERBD increased the KIB's trading facility to $30 million, and to $60 million in August.

In September 2007, the KIB decided to start retail banking in Kazakhstan and started to build a retail team. In June 2008, mortgages/secured loan for customers was introduced. In April 2008, a personal loan program along with re-finance feature was introduced. In March 2008, priority banking for VIP customers and a debit cards payroll product was launched.

In March 2011, Adnan Ally Agha resigned from his position as CEO and Alexander Tsoy was appointed acting CEO.

2016: Licence revocation 
On 27 December 2016, the Kazakhstan's central bank revoked the licence of Kazinvestbank citing its repeated failures to process payments and money transfers properly. The central bank said in a statement that it had appointed a temporary administrator at the bank and would seek its liquidation. The country's deposit insurance fund, also controlled by the central bank, would pay out Kazinvestbank's retail deposits within its insurance limits, the statement said.

References

External links 

http://www.afn.kz/ru/information-for-entities-of-financial-market/banks-sektor/2009-11-10-11-54-18/2009-11-12-04-54-19
http://www.kib.kz
https://www.reuters.com/article/kazinvestbank-licence-idUSL5N1EM0Q0

Banks of Kazakhstan
Investment banks
Financial services companies of Kazakhstan
Investment promotion agencies
Financial services companies established in 1993
Banks established in 1993
1993 establishments in Kazakhstan